Mount Tholus is the highest mountain, 825 m, in the ridge extending southwest from Postern Gap in the central part of Joinville Island. Surveyed by the Falkland Islands Dependencies Survey (FIDS) in 1953-54 and named by the United Kingdom Antarctic Place-Names Committee (UK-APC) in 1956. The name is descriptive, "tholus" being a circular, domed structure.

Mountains of Graham Land
Landforms of the Joinville Island group